Night Goblins may refer to:

Night Goblins'' (1923 book), a 1923 book by William Hughes Mearns illustrated by Ralph L. Boyer
Night Goblins in Orcs and Goblins (Warhammer)